Brunei competed in the 2013 Southeast Asian Games in Myanmar from 11 to 22 December 2013

Competitors

Medal summary

Medal by sport

Medalists

External links

2013
South
Nations at the 2013 Southeast Asian Games